The unsated sallow or arrowwood sallow (Metaxaglaea inulta) is a moth of the family Noctuidae. It is found from Nova Scotia to North Carolina, west to Missouri, north to Manitoba.

The wingspan is 40–48 mm. Adults are on wing from late August to November.

The larvae feed on the leaves of Viburnum species, including Viburnum dentatum, Viburnum lentago and Viburnum lantana.

External links
Bug Guide
Images

Xyleninae
Moths of North America